Zaliznyi Port, also known as Zheleznyy Port, is a resort village (selo) along the Black Sea coast, located in the  of Skadovsk Raion of Kherson oblast in Ukraine. It is situated near the outskirts of the Black Sea Biosphere Reserve, being located ~45 km from Skadovsk and ~60 km from Kherson cities.

Administrative status 
In December 1997, it was officially designated a resort village by the Ukrainian Verkhovna Rada. Since the abolition of Hola Prystan raion in the 2020 Administrative reform, it has been part of Skadovsk Raion of Kherson oblast, while maintaining the same lower-order territorial subdivisions of prior.

The Russian occupation of Kherson has reverted the 2020 reform in the territories under its control, administering Zaliznyi Port as part of Hola Prystan Raion.

History

Origin 

There are two main theories among historians as to the origin of the name "Zaliznyi Port", which translates to "Iron Port". The first, official version, claims that there was originally a pier connected to an Iron bridge in the village, extending over 100 meters into the sea, and at which ships loaded and unloaded, which became known as the Iron Port. Eventually, the bridge collapsed, but the name remained and was applied to the whole village. The second version claims that the name "Iron Port" began as a name sailors out at sea used as a guiding point, due to being guided by the light reflection of an iron roof on a barn there.

Although the village has its origins in the late 19th century, when  helped create a settlement there, it was formally founded in 1922 when it was given its name. According to official sources, in the early 1920s peasants from the city of Hladkivka, then known as Kelehei, settled Zaliznyi Port and engaged in agricultural work, whose products were exported using ships loaded on the Black Sea coast. By the 1940s, there was still only one street in the village, running across the seashore. Following the Annexation of Crimea by the Russian Federation, Zaliznyi Port developed as a popular tourist attraction for Ukrainians, due to bans on travel to the occupied Crimean peninsula.

Russo-Ukrainian war 

Subsequent to the start of the 2022 Russian invasion of Ukraine, during the Southern Ukraine campaign, the village was entirely occupied by Russian forces. This led to a collapse of the village's tourism industry, as well as causing some locals to protest the invasion. The protestors chanted the phrase "Zaliznyi Port is Ukraine", alongside signing the Ukrainian anthem and waving the Ukrainian flag.

On 4 April 2022, head of the Bekhtery rural hromada, Mykhailo Burak, was kidnapped by Russian forces while in Zalznyi port.

Ukrainian MP and Russian-collaborationist politician Aleksey Kovalyov, the former deputy head of Russian-occupied Kherson oblast, was assassinated in Zaliznyi Port on 28 August 2022.

On September 15, 2022, some news outlets claimed that Ukrainian forces attempted simultaneous naval landings on the Kinburn Split, Lazurne, and Zaliznyi Port. Both Kirill Stremousov, head of the Russian Kherson military-civilian administration, and Serhii Bratchuk, head of the Ukrainian Odesa Regional Military Administration, denied all reports of fighting in Zaliznyi Port.

The National Resistance Center of the Ukrainian Ministry of Defense claimed on October 12, 2022 that an unspecified amount of Iranian military instructors were present in the settlements of Zaliznyi Port, Hladivtsi, and Dzhankoi to train and monitor Russian forces in the use of Shahed-136 suicide drones. The Institute for the Study of War assessed that the instructors were likely a part of, or affiliated with, the Islamic Revolutionary Guard Corps.

Demographics

Population 
According to the 1989 USSR census, the population of the village consisted of 1,506 people, 756 of which were men and 750 women.

According to the 2001 Ukrainian census, the village had a population of 1,495.

Language 
Distribution of the population by native language according to the 2001 Ukrainian census:

Gallery

See also

References

External links 

 Official website
 Zaliznyi Port in 3D

Skadovsk Raion
Villages in Skadovsk Raion
Seaside resorts in Ukraine
Port cities and towns in Ukraine
Port cities of the Black Sea
Populated places established in 1922
Populated places established in the Ukrainian Soviet Socialist Republic